Wheelchair tennis events at the 2016 Summer Paralympics were held between 8 and 16 September at Olympic Tennis Centre, Rio. This was the seventh full Paralympic wheelchair tennis competition since the event was introduced in 1992, having been a demonstration event in 1988.

Classification

Players were classified according to the type and extent of their disability, and within that system according to gender.

The classification system allows players to compete against others with a similar level of function. All wheelchair tennis athletes must have a major or total loss of function in one or both legs to take part in the sport. further to that, there are two broad categorisations within wheelchair tennis; paraplegic players, with full arm function who play in gendered events, and quadriplegic ("quad tennis") players with restrictions in arm function, where no gender division occurs.

Qualification

A national paralympic committee (NPC) can enter a maximum of four qualified male athletes and four qualified female athletes in the men's and women's singles events, respectively and a maximum of three qualified athletes in the quad singles.

An NPC can enter a maximum of two qualified men's teams and two qualified women's teams, each containing two athletes, in the men's and women's doubles events, respectively, and a maximum of one qualified team of two athletes in the quad doubles – (mixed gender)

An NPC can be allocated a maximum of four male and four female qualification slots for athletes competing in the men's and women's events, and no more than three qualification slots in the quad sport class for a maximum quota allocation of eleven qualification slots per NPC. As such, doubles pairings in the larger teams must be made from the qualified singles players of that team.

The majority of the qualifiers will be chosen by rankings on 23 May 2016. A smaller number will be chosen by the Bipartite Commission, while the host country will also be allocated quota places. A small number of direct qualifiers will also be allocated places from continental games.

Competition schedule

Competition lasts from 9 to 16 September.

Medal table

Medalists

References
 

 
2016
2016 Summer Paralympics events
Summer Paralympics
Tennis tournaments in Brazil
Tennis in Rio de Janeiro